George Bonham (1803–1863) was Governor of Hong Kong.

George Bonham may also refer to:
Sir George Francis Bonham (1847–1927), British diplomat, ambassador to Serbia and Switzerland
Sir (George) Martin Anthony Bonham, 5th Baronet (born 1945) of the Bonham baronets

See also
Bonham (disambiguation)